In kinetics, König's theorem or König's decomposition is a mathematical relation derived by Johann Samuel König that assists with the calculations of angular momentum and kinetic energy of bodies and systems of particles.

For a system of particles 
The theorem is divided in two parts.

First part of König's theorem 

The first part expresses the angular momentum of a system as the sum of the angular momentum of the centre of mass and the angular momentum applied to the particles relative to the center of mass.

Proof 

Considering an inertial reference frame with origin O, the angular momentum of the system can be defined as:

The position of a single particle can be expressed as:

And so we can define the velocity of a single particle: 

The first equation becomes: 

But the following terms are equal to zero:

So we prove that:

where  M is the total mass of the system.

Second part of König's theorem  

The second part expresses the kinetic energy of a system of particles in terms of the velocities of the individual particles and the centre of mass.

Specifically, it states that the kinetic energy of a system of particles is the sum of the kinetic energy associated to the movement of the center of mass and the kinetic energy associated to the movement of the particles relative to the center of mass.

Proof 

The total kinetic energy of the system is:

Like we did in the first part, we substitute the velocity:

 

We know that  so if we define:

we're left with:

For a rigid body 
The theorem can also be applied to rigid bodies, stating that the kinetic energy K of a rigid body, as viewed by an observer fixed in some inertial reference frame N, can be written as:

References 
 Hanno Essén: Average Angular Velocity (1992), Department of Mechanics, Royal Institute of Technology, S-100 44 Stockholm, Sweden.
 Samuel König (Sam. Koenigio): De universali principio æquilibrii & motus, in vi viva reperto, deque nexu inter vim vivam & actionem, utriusque minimo, dissertatio, Nova acta eruditorum (1751) 125-135, 162-176 (Archived).
 Paul A. Tipler and Gene Mosca (2003), Physics for Scientists and Engineers (Paper): Volume 1A: Mechanics (Physics for Scientists and Engineers), W. H. Freeman Ed.,

Works Cited 

Mechanics
Physics theorems